Verneuil is a commune in the Charente department in southwestern France. It lies near the Lac de Lavaud, an artificial lake created by a dam in the river Charente, built in 1988.

Population

See also
Communes of the Charente department

References

Communes of Charente